This is a list in alphabetical order of cricketers who have played for Durham County Cricket Club in top-class matches since December 1991 when the team was elevated to official first-class status, the club joining the County Championship in 1992. Durham has been officially classified as a List A team since 1992, although the county did take part in 27 List A matches between 1964 and 1991. The club has been a first-class Twenty20 team since the inauguration of the Twenty20 Cup in 2003.

The details are the player's usual name followed by the years in which he was active as a Durham player and then his name is given as it usually appears on match scorecards. Note that many players represented other top-class teams besides Durham and that some played for the club in minor counties cricket before 1992. Current players are shown as active to the latest season in which they played for the club. The list excludes Second XI and other players who did not play for the club's first team, as well as the players who only played List A cricket for the side the 1992 season.

A
 Varun Aaron (2014) : V. R. Aaron
 Harry Adair (2019) : H. R. D. Adair
 Nathan Astle (2005) : N. J. Astle

B

C

D
 Jimmy Daley (1991–2002) : J. A. Daley
 Mark Davies (1998–2010) : A. M. Davies
 Ryan Davies (2018) : R. C. Davies
 Sean Dickson (2020) : S. R. Dickson
 Michael Di Venuto (2007–2012) : M. J. Di Venuto
 Matt Dixon (2018) : M. W. Dixon

E
 Ned Eckersley (2019–2020) : E. J. H. Eckersley
 Luke Evans (2007–2010) : L. Evans

F
 Michael Foster (1996–1999) : M. J. Foster
 Andrew Fothergill (1982–1994) : A. R. Fothergill
 Graeme Fowler (1993–1994) : G. Fowler

G
 Herschelle Gibbs (2012) : H. H. Gibbs
 Ottis Gibson (2006–2007) : O. D. Gibson
 Will Gidman (2007–2010) : W. R. S. Gidman
 John Glendenen (1988–1993) : J. D. Glendenen
 Lee Goddard (2007–2009) : L. J. Goddard
 Michael Gough (1998–2003) : M. A. Gough
 David Graveney (1991–1994) : D. A. Graveney

H

I
 Imran Tahir (2018) : Imran Tahir

J
 Keaton Jennings (2012–2017) : K. K. Jennings
 Dean Jones (1992) : D. M. Jones
 Michael Jones (2018–2020) : M. A. Jones

K
 Simon Katich (2000) : S. M. Katich
 Neil Killeen (1991–2010) : N. Killeen
 Reon King (2004) : R. D. King
 Pallav Kumar (2004) : P. Kumar

L

M

N
 Ashley Noffke (2005) : A. A. Noffke
 Marcus North (2004) : M. J. North

O
 Graham Onions (2004–2017) : G. Onions

P

R
 Ben Raine (2011–2020) : B. A. Raine
 Michael Richardson (2010–2019) : M. J. Richardson
 Nathan Rimmington (2018–2020) : N. J. Rimmington
 Ryan Robinson (1999–2000) : R. Robinson
 Angus Robson (2019) : A. J. Robson
 Mike Roseberry (1984–1998) : M. A. Roseberry
 Chris Rushworth (2004–2020) : C. Rushworth

S

T
 Tahir Mughal (2004) : Tahir Mughal
 Shaun Tait (2004) : S. W. Tait
 Ross Taylor (2010) : L. R. P. L. Taylor
 Callum Thorp (2005–2013) : C. D. Thorp
 Ashley Thorpe (2002–2003) : A. M. Thorpe
 Liam Trevaskis (2017–2020) : L. Trevaskis
 Mark Turner (2005–2006) : M. L. Turner

U
 Usman Arshad (2013–2016) : Usman Arshad
 Uzair Mahomed (2008) : Uzair Mahomed

W

See also
 List of Durham cricket captains

References

Durham
 
Durham County Cricket Club
Cricket